The 1946 All-Big Nine Conference football team consists of American football players selected to the All-Big Ten Conference teams selected by the Associated Press (AP) and United Press (UP) for the 1946 Big Nine Conference football season. The top vote getters in the AP polling were Bob Chappuis and Warren Amling, who each received 17 out of 18 possible points.

All Big-Ten selections

Ends
 Elmer Madar, Michigan (AP-1, UP-1)
 Cecil Souders, Ohio State (AP-1, UP-2)
 Ike Owens, Illinois (UP-1)
 Sam Zatkoff, Illinois (UP-2)

Tackles
 Russ Deal, Indiana (AP-1, UP-1)
 Warren Amling, Ohio State (AP-1, UP-2)
 Jack Carpenter, Michigan (UP-1)
 Bill Kay, Iowa (AP-2, UP-2)
 Bill Ivy, Northwestern (AP-2)

Guards
 Alex Agase, Illinois (AP-1, UP-1)
 Dick Barwegen, Purdue (AP-1, UP-2)
 Earl Banks, Iowa (UP-1)
 Dominic Tomasi, Michigan (UP-2)

Centers
 John Cannady, Indiana (AP-1, UP-2)
 Fred Negus, Wisconsin (AP-2, UP-1)

Quarterbacks
 Ben Raimondi, Indiana (AP-1, UP-1)
 Pete Pihos, Indiana (UP-2)

Halfbacks
 Bob Chappuis, Michigan (AP-1, UP-1)
 Vic Schwall, Northwestern (AP-1, UP-1)
 Julie Rykovich, Illinois (UP-2)
 Billy Bye, Minnesota (UP-2)

Fullbacks
 Dick Hoerner, Iowa (AP-1, UP-2)
 Joe Whisler, Ohio State (UP-1 [back])

Key
AP = Associated Press, chosen by conference coaches

UP = United Press, based on polling of conference coaches, scouts and newspapermen

Bold = Consensus first-team selection of both the AP and UPI

See also
1946 College Football All-America Team

References

1946 Big Nine Conference football season
All-Big Ten Conference football teams